Clinton–Columbia Historic District is a national historic district located at Elmira, Chemung County, New York.  It encompasses 83 contributing buildings in a predominantly residential section of Elmira.  It developed between about 1860 and 1924, and includes notable examples of Greek Revival, Italianate, Second Empire, Queen Anne, Colonial Revival, and American Craftsman style architecture. Notable buildings include two sets of Italianate style row houses and two sets of Second Empire style row houses.

It was added to the National Register of Historic Places in 2015.

References

Historic districts on the National Register of Historic Places in New York (state)
Greek Revival architecture in New York (state)
Italianate architecture in New York (state)
Second Empire architecture in New York (state)
Queen Anne architecture in New York (state)
Colonial Revival architecture in New York (state)
Buildings and structures in Chemung County, New York
National Register of Historic Places in Chemung County, New York